Charles de Villiers (born 1953) is a South African chess player.

He has won the South African Chess Championship six times; in 1975 (with Piet Kroon), 1977 (with David Walker), 1981, 1985 (with Clyde Wolpe), 1987 and 1989. He resides in Cape Town.

References

1953 births
Living people
South African chess players
Chess FIDE Masters